Mait Riisman  (23 September 1956 – 17 May 2018) was an Estonian water polo player  who was the part of the Soviet water polo team which won the gold medal in the 1980 Summer Olympics in Moscow. He was born in Tallinn.

See also
 Soviet Union men's Olympic water polo team records and statistics
 List of Olympic champions in men's water polo
 List of Olympic medalists in water polo (men)

References

External links
 

1956 births
2018 deaths
Olympic water polo players of the Soviet Union
Water polo players at the 1980 Summer Olympics
Olympic gold medalists for the Soviet Union
Olympic medalists in water polo
Sportspeople from Tallinn
Medalists at the 1980 Summer Olympics
Soviet male water polo players
Estonian male water polo players